The Archdiocese of Paris (Latin: Archidioecesis Parisiensis; French: Archidiocèse de Paris) is a Latin Church ecclesiastical jurisdiction or archdiocese of the Catholic Church in France. It is one of twenty-three archdioceses in France. The original diocese is traditionally thought to have been created in the 3rd century by St. Denis and corresponded with the Civitas Parisiorum; it was elevated to an archdiocese on October 20, 1622. Before that date the bishops were suffragan to the archbishops of Sens.

History
Its suffragan dioceses, created in 1966 and encompassing the Île-de-France region, are Créteil, Evry-Corbeil-Essonnes, Meaux, Nanterre, Pontoise, Saint-Denis, and  Versailles. Its liturgical centre is at Notre-Dame Cathedral in Paris. The archbishop resides on rue Barbet de Jouy in the 6th arrondissement, but there are diocesan offices in rue de la Ville-Eveque, rue St. Bernard and in other areas of the city. The archbishop is ordinary for Eastern Catholics (except Armenians and Ukrainians) in France.

The title of Duc de Saint-Cloud was created in 1674 for the archbishops.

Prior to 1790 the diocese was divided into three archdeaconries: France, Hurepoix, Brie.

Until the creation of new dioceses in 1966 there were two archdeaconries: Madeleine and St. Séverin. The reform reduced the diocese's size, losing the dioceses of Chartres, Orléans and Blois. 

The churches of the current diocese can be divided into several categories:

i) Latin Church parishes. These are grouped into deaneries and subject to vicars-general who often coincide with auxiliary bishops.

ii) Churches belonging to religious communities.

iii) Chapels for various foreign communities using various languages.

iv) Eastern-Church parishes and communities throughout France dependent on the Archbishop as Ordinary of the Ordinariate of France, Faithful of Eastern Rites.

Bishops of Paris

To 1000
 ?–c. 250: Denis (died c. 250), believed to be the first bishop of Paris
 Mallon
 Masse
 Marcus
 Adventus
 c. 346: Victorinus
 c. 360: Paulus
 ?–417?: Prudentius
 360–436: Marcellus
 ???–??: Vivianus (Vivien)
 ???–??: Felix
 ???–??: Flavianus
 ???–??: Ursicianus 
 ???–??: Apedinus 
 ???–??: Heraclius (511 - c. 525?)
 ???–??: Probatius
 533–545: Amelius
 545–552: Saffarace
 um 550: Eusebius I
 550–576: Germanus
 576–591: Ragnemod
 um 592: Eusebius II
 ???–??: Faramonde
 um 601: Simplicius
 606–621: Ceraunus/Ceran 
 Gendulf
 625–626: Leudébert (Léodebert)
 ?-650: Audobertus
 650–661: Landericus (Landry)
 661–663: Chrodobertus
 ???–??: Sigebrand († 664)
 ???–666: Importunus
 666–680: Agilbert
 690–692: Sigefroi
 693–698: Turnoald
 ???–??: Adulphe
 ???–??: Bernechaire († 722)
 722–730: Hugh of Champagne
 ???–??: Agilbert
 ???–??: Merseidus
 ???–??: Fédole
 ???–??: Ragnecapt
 ???–??: Radbert
 ???–??: Madalbert (Maubert)
 757-775: Déodefroi
 775–795: Eschenradus 
 ???–??: Ermanfroi (809?)
 811–831: Inchad
 831/2–857: Erchanrad II.
 858–870: Aeneas
 871–883: Ingelvin
 884–886: Goslin
 886–911: Anscharic (Chancellor 892, 894–896 and 900–910)
 911–922: Theodulphe
 922–926: Fulrad
 927-c. 935: Adelhelme
 937–941: Walter I., son of Raoul Tourte
 c. 954: Constantius
 950–977: Albert of Flanders
 ???–??: Garin
 979–980: Rainald I. (Renaud)
 984–989: Lisiard († 19. April 989)
 991–992: Gislebert (Engelbert) († 992)
 991–1017: Renaud of Vendôme

1000 to 1300
 1061–1095: Godfrey
 1096–1101: Guillaume de Montfort
 1104–1116: Galo/Walo
 1116–1123: Guibert
 c.1123–1141: Stephen of Senlis
 c.1143–1159: Theobald
 1159–1160: Peter Lombard
 1160–1196: Maurice de Sully
 1196–1208: Odo de Sully
 1208–1219: Pierre de La Chapelle (Peter of Nemours)
 1220–1223: William of Seignelay, Guillaume de Seignelay (previously bishop of Auxerre)
 1224–1227: Barthélmy
 1228–1249: William of Auvergne
 1249–1249: Walter de Château-Thierry (June to 23 September) (Gautier de Château-Thierry)
 1250–1268: Renaud Mignon de Corbeil
 1268–1279: Étienne Tempier
 1280–1280: Jean de Allodio (23 March 1280)
 1280–1288: Renaud de Hombliéres
 c.1289: Adenolfus de Anagnia
 1290–1304: Simon Matifort (Matifardi)

1300 to 1500
 1304–1319: Guillaume de Baufet
 1319–1325: Etienne de Bouret
 1325–1332: Hugues Michel
 1332–1342: Guillaume de Chanac (d. 1348)
 1342–1349: Foulques de Chanac
 1349–1350: Audoin-Aubert
 1350–1352: Pierre de Lafôret
 1353–1363: Jean de Meulent (also Bishop of Noyon)
 1362–1373: Etienne de Poissy
 1373–1384: Aimery de Magnac
 1384–1409: Pierre d'Orgemont, translated from bishop of Thérouanne
 1409–1420: Gérard de Montaigu, translated from Poitiers (1409)
 1420–1421: Jean Courtecuisse
 1421–1422: Jean de La Rochetaillée, translated to Rouen (1422)
 1423–1426: Jean IV de Nant, translated from Vienne (1423)
 1427–1438: Jacques du Chastelier(Châtelier)
 1439–1447: Denis du Moulin
 1447–1472: Guillaume Chartier
 1473–1492: Louis de Beaumont de la Forêt
 1492?–1492/1493?: Gérard Gobaille
 1492–1502: Jean-Simon de Champigny

From 1500
 1503–1519: Étienne de Poncher
 1519–1532: François Poncher
 1532–1541: Jean du Bellay
 1551–1563: Eustache du Bellay
 1564–1568: Guillaume Viole
 1573–1598: Pierre de Gondi
 1598–1622: Henri de Gondi

Archbishops of Paris
The Diocese of Paris was elevated to the rank of archdiocese on October 20, 1622.

 1622–1654: Jean-François de Gondi
 1654–1662: Jean François Paul de Gondi, cardinal de Retz
 1662–1664: Pierre de Marca
 1664–1671: Hardouin de Péréfixe de Beaumont
 1671–1695: François de Harlay de Champvallon
 1695–1729: Louis-Antoine de Noailles
 1729–1746: Charles-Gaspard-Guillaume de Vintimille du Luc
 1746: Jacques Bonne-Gigault de Bellefonds
 1746–1781: Christophe de Beaumont
 1781–1802: Antoine-Eléonore-Léon Le Clerc de Juigné
 1791–1794: Jean-Baptiste-Joseph Gobel (appointed by the Republic of France; not recognized by the pope)
 temporarily abolished during the French Revolution
 1802–1808: Jean Baptiste de Belloy-Morangle
 1810–1817: Jean-Sifrein Maury
 1817–1821: Alexandre-Angélique Talleyrand de Périgord
 1821–1839: Hyacinthe-Louis De Quelen
 1840–1848: Denis Auguste Affre
 1848–1857: Marie Dominique Auguste Sibour
 1857–1862: François-Nicholas-Madeleine Morlot
 1863–1871: Georges Darboy
 1871–1886: Joseph Hippolyte Guibert
 1886–1908: François-Marie-Benjamin Richard
 1908–1920: Léon-Adolphe Amette
 1920–1929: Louis-Ernest Dubois
 1929–1940: Jean Verdier
 1940–1949: Emmanuel Célestin Suhard
 1949–1966: Maurice Feltin
 1966–1968: Pierre Veuillot
 1968–1981: François Marty
 1981–2005: Jean-Marie Lustiger
 2005–2017: André Vingt-Trois
 2017–2021: Michel Aupetit
 2022-present: Laurent Ulrich

Auxiliary bishops
 1919–1926: Benjamin-Octave Roland-Gosselin
 1922–1943: Emmanuel Chaptal
 1954–1962: Jean Rupp
 1968–1981: Daniel Pezeril
 1979–1980: Paul Poupard
 1986–1997: Claude Frikart
 1988–1999: André Vingt-Trois
 1996–2000: Éric Aumonier
 1997–: Pierre d'Ornellas
 2006–: Jean-Yves Nahmias
 2006–: Jérôme Beau
 2008–: Renauld de Dinechin
 2008–2018: Éric de Moulins-Beaufort
 2013–2014: Michel Aupetit
 2016–: Thibault Verny
 2016–2021: Denis Jachiet
 2019–: Philippe Marsset

See also
Catholic Church in France
List of Catholic dioceses in France
List of religious buildings in Paris
List of Roman Catholic archdioceses

Notes

Bibliography

Reference works
  (Use with caution; obsolete)
  (in Latin) 
 (in Latin)

Studies

External links

 

Paris
 
 
Christianity in Paris
3rd-century establishments in Roman Gaul